The 2018 African Rally Championship was the 38th season of the African Rally Championship (ARC), the FIA regional zone rally championship for the African continent. The season began on February 23 in the Côte d'Ivoire, and ended on October 7 in Rwanda, after seven events.

Skoda Fabia driver Manvir Singh Baryan won his second consecutive title. Baryan again won four of the seven rallies, taking victory in South Africa, Zambia, Uganda and Tanzania. Baryan won the title by 56 points over Mitsubishi Lancer driver, Italian-Kenyan Piero Cannobio who had only two top-three finishes amongst ARC competitors. Baryan's second title was the fourth consecutive title won by Kenyan drivers.

Event calendar and results

There were seven rallies in the 2018 African Rally Championship. The only change from the 2017 schedule was the previously season-ending Zambia International Motor Rally moved from October to June, becoming the fourth round of the championship:

Championship standings
The 2018 African Rally Championship points are as follows:

References

External links

African Rally Championship
African
Rally Championship